The 2007–08 season was A.C. Cesena's 68th season in existence and the club's fourth consecutive season in the top flight of Italian football. In addition to the domestic league, Cesena participated in this season's editions of the Coppa Italia. The season covers the period from 1 July 2007 to 30 June 2008.

Pre-season and friendlies

Competitions

Overview

Serie B

League table

Results summary

Results by round

Matches

Source:

Coppa Italia

References

A.C. Cesena seasons
Cesena